Seymour Canal is an inlet penetrating deep into the southeastern part of Admiralty Island, Southeast Alaska, United States. The inlet was first charted in 1794 by Joseph Whidbey, master of  during George Vancouver's 1791–95 expedition. Vancouver later named it "Seymour's Channel". Two large islands are located within it: Swan Island to the north, and Tiedeman Island just to its south.

References

Inlets of Alaska
Bodies of water of Hoonah–Angoon Census Area, Alaska